

Khosrogerd Minaret is a 12th-century tower located  to the west of Sabzevar, Iran, and is all that remains of the Silk Road town of Khosrogerd, destroyed by the Mongols in 1220 AD. It is an example of Seljuk architecture.

The minaret was built around 1112 AD (in the 6th century AH) by the order of "Taj-o-dowleh Ab-ol-ghasem-ebn-e-saeed" during the time of the reign of the Seljuik Dynasty, and is almost  in height. 
On top of the tower are tablets in the kufic script, and diamond decorations. At the time of its construction it was one of the tallest spires in Iran. It was registered as national treasure of Iran in 1932.

According to archeological researches, the tower is a free-standing spire which was built as a path-finding guide for caravans along the path of the Silk Road, and served as guide for caravans.

See also

List of historical Iranian architects

Further reading
http://www.iranreview.org/content/Documents/Iranian_Architecture

References

Arthur Upham Pope, Persian Architecture, 1965, New York, p. 16

External links
Khosrogerd Minaret at Iran Touring and Tourism Online

Minarets in Iran
Seljuk architecture
Sabzevar County
Buildings and structures in Razavi Khorasan Province
Tourist attractions in Razavi Khorasan Province